The Turkmenistan eyelid gecko or Turkmenian eyelid gecko (Eublepharis turcmenicus) is a ground-dwelling lizard native to Turkmenistan and northern Iran. It is oviparous, typically laying clutches of two eggs. Mainly insectivorous, it may also eat smaller vertebrates. Like many other lizards has the ability to shed its tail (autotomy).

References

Kaverkin, Y and N. L. Orlov. (1995) Experience of captive breeding of Eublepharis turcmenicus Darevsky Russian Journal of Herpetology.

Eublepharis
Geckos of Iran
Reptiles of Central Asia
Reptiles described in 1977
Taxa named by Ilya Darevsky